Shattered is a Canadian police procedural series created by Rick Drew. The main character (played by Callum Keith Rennie) is a tough, smart homicide detective in Vancouver who suffers from dissociative identity disorder, also known as multiple personality disorder.

His wife Ella is played by Molly Parker. In the first moments of the series, Ben is bonded in blood to his determined, beautiful partner Amy Lynch. While they work to solve the murder cases that cross their desk daily, Ben copes with the fascinating complexities of his secret disorder, and the uncertainty of never knowing which alternate personality will surface, or when. Other regular characters of the series are Sergeant Pam ‘TC’ Garrett, John ‘Hall’ Holland a young, handsome and ambitious detective, and Terry Rhodes, Ben’s best friend and ex-partner.

Plot
In an interview with Rennie in 2008, the show's plot was described as a police procedural drama, following the adventures of an ex-cop, Kyle Loggins, traumatized by the murder of his family. According to this interview and press releases, the trauma triggered a dissociative identity disorder, wherein the victim manifests multiple personalities. In the pilot, Kyle's personalities include Jack, his brash alpha-male alter ego; Hal, the teenage nerd who personifies Kyle’s analytical and introverted side; and Tyler, the quiet little boy who surfaces when he is at his most vulnerable. Kyle teams up  with rookie policewoman Madeline Maguire who exploits Kyle’s unique investigative abilities.

Production
The pilot for the series was shot in November 2008. The series was picked up for 13 one-hour episodes in April 2009.
According to new press releases, the plot for the actual series differs from the one for the pilot.

Cast
Callum Keith Rennie as Ben Sullivan
Molly Parker as Ella Sullivan
Camille Sullivan as Amy Lynch
Karen LeBlanc as Sergeant Pam "TC" Garrett
Clé Bennett as John "Hall" Holland
Chad Rook as Patrick Michaels
Martin Cummins as Terry Rhodes
Brian Markinson as Dr. Ryan Disilvio
Michael Eklund as Nick Ducet

Pilot
Kyle Loggins: Callum Keith Rennie
Det. Madeline Maguire: Laura Jordan
Jack: Colin Cunningham
Det. Bruce Catelli: John Cassini
Inspector Roscoe: Brian Markinson
Hal: Chad Krowchuk
Tyler: Quinn Lord
Dr. Lynn Tanninger: Gabrielle Rose
Nora: Michele Lonsdale Smith
Raveena Sood: Daesha Danielle Usman
Amita Sandhu: Rekha Sharma
Hostess (as Julia Anderson): Julia Benson
Oliver Quinn: Ian Tracey
Akbar Sood: Sugith Varughese
Bouncer: Viv Leacock

Episodes
When initially broadcast, new episodes of Shattered would premiere at 9:00 pm on cable channel Showcase and then repeat at 10:00 pm on broadcast network Global. Only 10 episode were shown in Canada during the first run of the show and they were broadcast out of order based on the "previously on" segments at the beginning of each episode. Among repeats in late 2010 and early 2011 the three episodes skipped in the first run are being shown on Showcase. Shattered is also being shown on TAC, a Canadian cable channel which shows programming with Described Video for the visually impaired. The Universal Channel in the UK will air all 13 episodes. The Canadian viewer data is for the broadcasts on Global.

Reception
The premiere episode, "The Sins of the Father", was watched by 428,000 Canadian viewers.
The second episode was watched by 375,000 viewers. In the UK and Republic of Ireland the series was aired on Universal as a launch programme for the channel's re-launch. It was low-rated to begin with in a 10:00 pm slot and was eventually moved to midnight to finish off its run.

Awards and nominations

References

External links

2010 Canadian television series debuts
2010 Canadian television series endings
2010s Canadian crime drama television series
Dissociative identity disorder in television
Global Television Network original programming
Showcase (Canadian TV channel) original programming
Television shows filmed in Vancouver
Television shows set in Vancouver
Television series by Entertainment One
Television series by Corus Entertainment
Canadian police procedural television series